White Mills is a village and census-designated place in Texas Township, Wayne County, Pennsylvania, United States. The CDP's population was 659 at time of the 2010 United States Census.

White Mills is located along U.S. Route 6 in the eastern part of Wayne County.

History
In 1803, Jonathan Brink of Milford, Pennsylvania, purchased the Haines property and erected one of the early sawmills just below White Mills.

Around 1823, a sawmill was constructed on the Lackawaxen River near where the Chroma Tube factory stands today. At the time, the area between Honesdale and Hawley, Pennsylvania, was sparsely settled, though it is likely that several farms and dwellings dotted the surrounding vicinity. The new mill, built for a Daniel Parry (sometimes spelled Perry) & Company of Philadelphia, and its ancillary buildings were all painted white, which led to the village being called "White Mills."

In 1865, Christian Dorflinger, a French-speaking Alsatian immigrant, opened a glass factory in White Mills. Dorflinger had arrived in the United States in 1846 and established a prosperous glass company based in Brooklyn in 1852, but decided to build a dedicated factory and company town for the Dorflinger Glass Company at White Mills, in order to escape the pollution and violence of New York at the time. At White Mills, Dorflinger and his sons built a sprawling factory complex and more than 100 houses for workers and their families. The town was in large part populated by craftsman who Dorflinger invited from Europe to work at the factory. Dorflinger Glass produced fine cut lead crystal that was used in the White House services of the Lincoln and Harrison administrations, and at prominent occasions such as the weddings of William Vanderbilt and Nellie Grant. Production at the factory continued until 1921, when pressures related to prohibition and lingering effects of an embargo on German potash forced the company to cease operations. Upon the factory's closing, White Mills lost much of its population. In 2017, the remaining Dorflinger Glass Factory buildings were restored and turned into a museum.

Geography
According to the United States Census Bureau, White Mills has a total area of 1.517 sq mi (3.927 km2), of which 1.483 sq mi (3.840 km2) is land and 0.034 sq mi (0.087 km2), or 2.2%, is water.

Demographics
As of the Census of 2010, there were 659 people, 280 households, and 191 families in White Mills. The CDP's population density was 444 people per square mile (172/km2), and there were 325 housing units at an average density of 214/sq mi (82.8/km2). The racial makeup of the populace was 96.7% White, 1.1% African American, 1.1% Native American, 0.2% Asian, 0.0% Pacific Islander, 0.5% of other races, and 0.6% of two or more races. Hispanics and Latinos of all races made up 3.0% of the population.

68.2% of White Mills' households were families, 48.9% were headed by a heterosexual married couple (Pennsylvania did not allow same-sex marriage until May 20, 2014, after the 2010 Census had been completed), and 28.6% included children under the age of 18. 13.2% of households were headed by a female householder with no husband present, 6.1% by a male householder with no wife present, and 31.8% consisted of non-families. 28.2% of all households were made up of individuals, and 12.8% consisted of a person 65 years of age or older living alone. The average household size was 2.35 and the average family size was 2.83.

White Mills' age distribution was 21.1% under the age of 18, 6.8% between the ages of 18 and 24, 21.9% between 25 and 44, 30.7% between 45 and 64, and 19.6% 65 years of age or older. The population's median age was 45.2 years. For every 100 females, there were 97.9 males. For every 100 females age 18 and over, there were 100.0 males in the same age range.

According to American Community Survey (ACS) estimates, the median income for a household in White Mills in 2013 was $50,045, and the median income for a family was $49,531. Males had a median income of $34,250, while females had a median income of $18,239. The per capita income for the CDP was $27,661. 11.8% of families and 14.0% of people were below the Census Bureau's poverty thresholds (different from the federally defined poverty guidelines), including 28.1% of those under age 18 and 0.0% of those age 65 or over.

According to self-reported ancestry figures recorded by the ACS, the five largest ancestral groups in White Mills in 2013 were Germans (40.3%), Irish (25.9%), Italians (18.1%), Americans (12.6%), and Poles (7.5%).

References

Census-designated places in Wayne County, Pennsylvania
Census-designated places in Pennsylvania
Unincorporated communities in Wayne County, Pennsylvania
Unincorporated communities in Pennsylvania